Time Landscape (1965-1978–Present) is an Land artwork by American artist Alan Sonfist (1946- ). It consists of plants that were native to the New York City area in pre-colonial times. Those planted were replanted here until 1978, on a rectangular plot of 25' x 40' situated in lower Manhattan at the northeast corner of La Guardia Place and West Houston Street.
The New York City Department of Parks and Recreation describes the artwork: "When it was first planted, Time Landscape portrayed the three stages of forest growth from grasses to saplings to grown trees. The southern part of the plot represented the youngest stage and now has birch trees and beaked hazelnut shrubs, with a layer of wildflowers beneath. The center features a small grove of beech trees (grown from saplings transplanted from Sonfist’s favorite childhood park in the Bronx) and a woodland with red cedar, black cherry, and witch hazel above groundcover of mugwort, Virginia creeper, aster, pokeweed, and milkweed. The northern area is a mature woodland dominated by oaks, with scattered white ash and American elm trees. Among the numerous other species in this miniforest are oak, sassafras, sweetgum, and tulip trees, arrowwood and dogwood shrubs, bindweed and catbrier vines, and violets." Sonfist's intention was to create a natural memorial akin to war memorials.

After the planting, the piece presents questions on the nature of the project and what is "natural".
Post-colonial plants intrude into the park.
On one hand, Sonfist has stated that he is not bothered.
On the other, the evocation of the past is what distinguishes it from other green areas.
NY DoP&R has taken to periodically weeding out invaders and incinerating them.

Timeline

1965:  Proposal of the project.
1978:  The Time Landscape project is unveiled by Sonfist.
2005:  A second part of "Human/Nature Art and the Environment" is published in honor of the artwork's 40th anniversary.

Publications

"Natural Phenomena as Public Monuments", essay by Alan Sonfist 1968
Publication of his lecture series at the Metropolitan Museum of Art in 1969
"Art in the Land: A Critical Anthology of Environmental Art", E.P. Dutton, 1983, Editor: Alan Sonfist
"Nature: The End of Art, distributed by Thames and Hudson", published by Gil Ori, 2004 republished in Europe and Asia
"Human/Nature Art and the Environment Part 2, Alan Sonfist 'Time Landscape (1965-1978-Present)'"

See also
Living sculpture
Social sculpture
Wheatfield — A Confrontation, another piece of land art in New York.

References

External links
Time Landscape
Land Use Database, Center of Land Use Interpretation

Photos
New York daily photo blogspot
Flickr page of wallyg

Public art in New York City
Buildings and structures in Manhattan